Robert Urquhart may refer to:

 Robert Urquhart (actor) (1922–1995), Scottish character actor
 Roy Urquhart (Robert Elliott Urquhart, 1901–1988), British Army general

See also
Urquhart (surname)